Pryshchevka is a rural locality (a khutor) in Kletskoye Rural Settlement, Sredneakhtubinsky District, Volgograd Oblast, Russia. The population was 165 as of 2010. There are 10 streets.

Geography 
Pryshchevka is located 31 km southwest of Srednyaya Akhtuba (the district's administrative centre) by road. Kletsky is the nearest rural locality.

References 

Rural localities in Sredneakhtubinsky District